William Lindsay Waugh (27 November 1921 — 26 March 2009) was a Scottish footballer who played as a winger.

Career
Waugh began his career in Scotland, playing for Heart of Midlothian and Bathgate Thistle. In September 1944, Waugh moved to England, signing for Luton Town. During his time with Luton, Waugh made 135 Football League appearances, scoring nine times. Prior to the 1950–51 season, Waugh signed for Second Division club Queens Park Rangers. Over the course of three seasons, Waugh scored six times in 77 league games for the club. In 1953, Waugh joined Bournemouth & Boscombe Athletic, staying with the club for a season. In 1954, Waugh dropped into Non-League football, signing for Chelmsford City. In March 1955, Waugh signed for Bedford Town. Waugh later played for Ashford Town (Kent) and March Town United.

References

1921 births
2009 deaths
Association football wingers
Scottish footballers
Footballers from Edinburgh
Heart of Midlothian F.C. players
Bathgate Thistle F.C. players
Luton Town F.C. players
Queens Park Rangers F.C. players
AFC Bournemouth players
Chelmsford City F.C. players
Bedford Town F.C. players
Ashford United F.C. players
March Town United F.C. players
English Football League players